Lay Down Your Arms may refer to:

Literature
 Lay Down Your Arms! (novel), English title of the 1889 novel Die Waffen Nieder! by Bertha von Suttner

Music
 "Lay Down Your Arms" (1956 song), a popular song in Swedish, then in English with many covers, most notably The Chordettes and Anne Shelton
 "Lay Down Your Arms" (The Graces song), notably covered by Belinda Carlisle
 "Lay Down Your Arms" (Doron Levinson song), a peace song by Israeli Doron Levinson in Hebrew and later on in English  
 "Lay Down Your Arms", a song by Asia from their 1992 album Aqua   
 "Lay Down Your Arms", a song by Per Gessle from The World According to Gessle
 "Lay Down Your Arms", a song by The 69 Eyes from their album Wasting the Dawn. The song features Ville Valo
 "Lay Down Your Arms", a song by Tim Christensen from his album Honeyburst
Also 
 "Soldier of Love (Lay Down Your Arms)", a song originally recorded by Arthur Alexander, covered by several artists
 "The Tea Leaf Prophecy (Lay Down Your Arms)", a song by Joni Mitchell from her album Chalk Mark in a Rain Storm

Plays
 Lay Down Your Arms, 1970 British television play written by Dennis Potter and directed by Christopher Morahan, set during the Suez crisis